Man Seyr (also Romanized as Man S̱eyr; also known as Manīzh, Man Sar, Mensar, Monīr, and Munnīr) is a village in Mosharrahat Rural District, in the Central District of Ahvaz County, Khuzestan Province, Iran. At the 2006 census, its population was 38, in 8 families.

References 

Populated places in Ahvaz County